Thomas Southgate (22 December 1894 – 7 November 1970) was a British rower. He competed in the men's coxless pairs event at the 1924 Summer Olympics with his brother-in-law Gordon Killick.

References

External links
 

1894 births
1970 deaths
British male rowers
Olympic rowers of Great Britain
Rowers at the 1924 Summer Olympics
People from Tetbury